John Okoli is a Nigerian player who currently plays as a striker for Al Mokawloon Al Arab SC.

Career

Early career
Okoli started his career with Lagos-based Soccer Warriors. He then moved to Messiah Academy, where he scored 29 goals in 17 appearances. In the 2016/17 season, he joined Nigeria Professional Football League club MFM F.C.

Yenicami Ağdelen
The striker's first professional move was on 9 September 2017, when joined Northern Cypriot club Yenicami SK for the 2017–2018 season.
He scored 8 league goals and 1 goal in Tashsin Mertekci Cyprus Cup taking his goal tally to 9 goals in 27 helping the club win the Süper Lig 2017–2018 title.

Gonyeli S.K.

Okoli joined Gonyeli S.K. on 17 August 2018 on loan until the end of the season. He scored 22 goals in 30 appearances for Gonyeli.

Göçmenköy İdman Yurdu

On 3 September 2019, the website Futbalgalore.com reported that John Okoli will play on loan at Gocmenkoy in the 2019/2020 season.

Honours

MFM FC
Lagos (1): 2017

Yenicami Ağdelen
Süper Lig (1): 2017–18

References

External links
 KTFF profile

1997 births
Living people
Nigerian footballers
Nigerian expatriate footballers
MFM F.C. players
Nigeria Professional Football League players
Expatriate footballers in Northern Cyprus
Nigerian expatriate sportspeople in Northern Cyprus
Expatriate footballers in Egypt
Nigerian expatriate sportspeople in Egypt
Sportspeople from Lagos
Association football forwards